The Kur is a river in the Khabarovsk Krai, Russia. At its confluence with the river Urmi it forms the Tunguska, which is a left tributary of the Amur.

The Kur and Urmi often flood in the summer.

References

Sources 
 Kur River  

Rivers of Khabarovsk Krai